WRJN (1400 AM) is a MOR radio station located in Racine, Wisconsin, and serving the areas of Racine, Kenosha and Milwaukee, Wisconsin. The station is owned by David Magnum, through licensee Magnum Communications, Inc., along with local sister station WVTY.  Its studios and transmitter are co-located in Racine.

The station has a strong Racine-Kenosha based emphasis, featuring a heavy slate of local news. local sports and local information and talk, combined with its music format.

Talk radio era
From the late 1980s until 2014, WRJN carried a Talk Radio format with a combination of local and syndicated talk. The station was the Milwaukee-area affiliate for syndicated shows from Lionel, Bill O'Reilly and Mike Gallagher as well as Alan Colmes, Ed Schultz, Coast To Coast AM and Leslie Marshall in its later year, effectively serving as a "last resort" station for shows not picked up in the Milwaukee market by WTMJ or WISN. For a period in the mid 1990s, WRJN would simulcast sister station WEZY's Easy Listening format during the overnight hours. 

WRJN was affiliated with ABC and aired Paul Harvey's daily commentaries prior to his death.

WRJN celebrated 85 years of continuous service to Racine on December 6, 2011. It is among the nation's most long running stations and the 3rd oldest station with the same call letters in Wisconsin.

Sale to Magnum Broadcasting and format change
On June 25, 2014, Bliss Communications announced that it would sell WRJN and WVTY (then WEZY), along with sister stations WBKV and WBWI-FM in West Bend, to David Magnum's Magnum Communications, Inc. Bliss had owned WRJN and WEZY since 1997. The sale, at a price of $2.25 million, was consummated on October 31, 2014.

On December 1, 2014, WRJN dropped all syndicated programming from the lineup and replaced it with a mixture of local talk, sports, and Classic Hits, Oldies and Adult Contemporary Music with the new positioner "Your Radio Friend", which is similar format to their new sister station WPDR in Portage. The music format shifted to 60s and 70s Oldies after sister station WVTY adopted an Adult Hits format in May 2015. This was to prevent overlap. 

In the fall of 2016, two FM Translators were added, W260CV on 99.9FM in Racine, and W251BU on 98.1FM in Kenosha.

References

External links
WRJN Website

WRJN Radio Station history from 1928

RJN
Radio stations established in 1926
1926 establishments in Wisconsin